Banksia horrida, commonly known as prickly dryandra, is a species of shrub that is endemic to Western Australia. It has hairy stems, linear, pinnatifid leaves with sharply pointed teeth on the edges, up to sixty cream-coloured flowers in each head and hairy, egg-shaped follicles.

Description
There are between five and twelve sharply pointed, triangular teeth on each side of the leaves.

Taxonomy and naming
This species was first formally described in 1856 by Carl Meissner who gave it the name Dryandra horrida and published the description in de Candolle's Prodromus Systematis Naturalis Regni Vegetabilis from specimens collected by James Drummond in the Swan River Colony. The specific epithet (horrida) is a Latin word meaning "shaggy" or "prickly". In 2007 Austin Mast and Kevin Thiele transferred all dryandras to the genus Banksia and renamed this species Banksia hewardiana.

Distribution and habitat
Banksia horrida grows in kwongan in scattered locations between Tammin, Corrigin and Narembeen in the Avon Wheatbelt biogeographic region.

Conservation status
Banksia horrida is classified as "Priority Three" by the Government of Western Australia Department of Parks and Wildlife meaning that it is poorly known and known from only a few locations but is not under imminent threat.

References

 

horrida
Endemic flora of Western Australia
Plants described in 1856
Taxa named by Kevin Thiele